The Dans may refer to:
A fictional gang that appeared in the Beano comic strip Karate Sid from 1987 to 1988
A collective term for the Big Dan and Little Dan mines in Temagami, Ontario, Canada